is one of 9 wards of Kobe, Japan. It has an area of 11.46 km², and a population of 96,072 (2018). This region suffered the largest number of casualties in the Great Hanshin earthquake.

Demographics
Nearly, Nagata-ku's population is decreasing, but foreigners are increasing. 
Nagata-ku has the largest Korean and Vietnamese Communities in Kobe.

Education

West Kobe Korean Elementary School (西神戸朝鮮初級学校), a North Korean school, is in the ward.

The South Korean government maintains the Korean Education Center in this ward.

References

External links

Official website of Nagata-ku, Kobe 

Wards of Kobe